Sandefjord Upper Secondary School (often abbreviated to SVGS) is a public upper secondary school in Sandefjord, Vestfold, Norway. It is the largest secondary school in Norway.

It is housed in two-story  facilities which are located at Krokemoa near the Bugårds Park. It is an International Baccalaureate World School, but it also offers general academics (the college preparatory studiespesialisering of the Norwegian school system), as well as elite sports, vocational education, and more.

It is located across the road from a Meny supermarket, and is few meters from Bugårdsparken. The school is home to several student-run businesses, including a bakery, hair salon and an eatery known as Restaurant Barden. The school has about 2,000 students and 350 employees.

History 
Sandefjord Upper Secondary School was established in 1997 when four schools merged to become SVGS:

 Sandefjord Gymnas (established as Sandefjord Høyere Allmennskole in 1885, renamed Sandefjord Gymnas in 1964)
 Sandar Videregående Skole (established as Sandar Yrkesskole in 1941)
 Sandefjord Kokk og Stuertskole (est. 1893)
 Sandefjord Handelsgymnas (est. 1917)

With over 2,000 students and nine branches of study, Sandefjord Upper Secondary School is very large by national standards. It is situated 120 km (74.5 mi.) southwest of Oslo at the Krokemoa area of Sandefjord, Vestfold County. An early challenge was to unify the different schools under a single identity and to provide adapted learning for all students. The school offers general and vocational studies, and students of all branches are subject to the same organizational and administrative structure. From its beginning, it was realized that the new school may have problems with dealing with such a large and broad student body. The difficulty was aggravated by the need for new structures, each having specialized, course-related functions. The need for a social communal space was met with the construction of The Forum, a meeting place which consists of a dining area, bakery, cantina, bookstore, and a nearby library. The Forum has been described as the school's "base-camp of student services", and also houses offices for follow-up services provided to school drop-outs. There are also a health service office, educational and career services, along with a teachers’ workshop.

As part of the integration of vocational and general academics at Sandefjord Upper Secondary School, the school has established a wide range of curricular and extra-curricular opportunities for students. High quality and modern structures were made for specialized teaching branches, particularly for students in the music and athletic programs. Students are encouraged to become self-reliant by taking responsibility for environmental and enterprise links with the local business community in Sandefjord. The school's ICT project has been regarded as an important way of encouraging teachers of various subjects to work together in changing teaching methods and modify the student-teacher relationships.

Sandefjord Upper Secondary School has an emphasis on student-centered learning and providing authentic experiences to students, illustrated for example by the school's close links to schools in Soweto in Johannesburg, South Africa. The bond between the schools has resulted in SVGS students volunteering for extended periods of time in Soweto. The South Africa project began in 1999 and offers the opportunity for students at SVGS to travel to Johannesburg in order to visit schools in Soweto. Students from Soweto also visit SVGS as part of the international project.

Students have been involved in a variety of projects, including the establishment of a soap factory which is located on campus. Student businesses include a bakery, butcher, physiotherapy, barber, and restaurant. The High School operates its own bookshop and has an on-campus priest hired as faculty. The school's library has a thousand visitors per day. The school's annual budget is 190,000,000 NOK, where 90 percent covers faculty salaries. SVGS has an exchange program with BASF in Ludwigshafen, Germany.

Educational programs 
Education Programmes for Specialization in General Studies:
 Specialization in General Studies: International Baccalaureate (IB) 
 Programme for Sports and Physical Education
 Programme for Natural Science and Mathematics Studies
 Programme for Social Sciences and Economics Studies
 Programme for Language Studies
 Programme for Art, Design, and Architecture
 Programme for Music, Dance, and Drama
 Programme for Athletic Studies

Vocational Education Programmes:
 Service and Transport
 Electricity and Electronics
 Technical and Industrial Production
 Design, Arts and Crafts
 Restaurant and Food Processing
 Sales, Service, and Security
 Healthcare, Childhood and Youth Development

Athletics
SVGS has two athletic programs: the Programme for Sports and Physical Education (Idrettsfag) and the Programme for Athletic Studies (Toppidrett). Classes are offered in sports such as association football, handball, basketball, volleyball, badminton, cross-country skiing, alpine skiing, ice skating, dancing, swimming, and floorball. Sports offered at the Programme for Athletic Studies also include tennis, orientation, rowing, golf, archery, martial arts, gymnastics, track and field, and underwater rugby. The school also uses facilities in nearby Bugårds Park for various sports. The school has a close corporation with Sandefjord Fotball, a professional football club, as well as Sandefjord TIF Handball and IL Runar.

Notable alumni 

 Espen Sandberg, film director
 Joachim Rønning, film director
 Sonja Mandt, politician
 Jonas Kilmork Vemøy, musician
 Linn-Kristin Riegelhuth Koren, handball player
 Einar Sand Koren, handball player
 Heidi Løke, handball player
 Bjørn Ole Gleditsch, current Mayor of Sandefjord, Norway
 Frederic Hauge, head of the Bellona Foundation
 Lukas Zabulionis, musician
 Lise Davidsen, singer
 Mathias Stubø, musician
 Vadim Demidov, football player
 Per Mathisen, musician
 Geir Ludvig Fevang, football player
 Kevin Larsen, football player
 Mats Haakenstad, football player
 Ole Breistøl, football player
 Sofie Karoline Haugen, ice skater
 Tormod Bjørnetun Haugen, ice skater
 Simeon Thoresen, mixed martial artist
 Magnus Søndenå, handball player

Notable faculty 
 Øystein Havang, handball player
 Karl Erik Bøhn, handball player
 Hans Mathisen, musician
 Kristine Duvholt Havnås, handball player
 Roger Kjendalen, handball player
 Per Ramberg, former Mayor of Sandefjord, Norway
 Gunnar Pettersen, handball player
 Tonje Larsen, handball player
 Olaf Alfred Hoffstad, former Mayor of Sandefjord

References

External links 
 

Sandefjord
Buildings and structures in Sandefjord
International Baccalaureate schools in Norway
Secondary schools in Norway
Educational institutions established in 1997
1997 establishments in Norway